Lloyd's of London is a 1936 American drama film directed by Henry King. It stars Freddie Bartholomew, Tyrone Power, Madeleine Carroll, and Guy Standing. The supporting cast includes George Sanders, Virginia Field, and C. Aubrey Smith. Loosely based on historical events, the film follows the dealings of a man who works at Lloyd's of London during the Napoleonic Wars. Lloyd's of London was a hit; it demonstrated that 22-year-old Tyrone Power, in his first starring role, could carry a film, and that the newly formed 20th Century Fox was a major Hollywood studio.

Plot
In 1770, youngster Jonathan Blake overhears two sailors discussing something suspicious in his aunt's ale-house in a Norfolk fishing village. He persuades his more respectable best friend, Horatio Nelson, to sneak aboard the sailors' ship with him. They overhear a plot involving insurance fraud. Jonathan decides to warn the insurers, walking 100 miles to London to Lloyd's Coffee House, where the insurers conduct their business. Mr. Angerstein, the head of one of the syndicates there, listens to him and is saved from a great loss. When asked, Angerstein explains to Jonathan that waiters at Lloyd's are also insurance auctioneers. Instead of a monetary reward, Jonathan asks to work as a waiter.

Many years later, when he is a grown man and Lloyd's has moved and become Lloyd's of London, Jonathan shows Angerstein a system of semaphore telegraph apparatuses he has invented, which can relay messages across the English Channel in five minutes.  Around the turn of the century, while gathering news in France disguised as a French priest, he rescues Elizabeth, a secretive young Englishwoman picked up by the French after Napoleon orders the arrest of all English people. On the boat trip back to England, they fall in love. Elizabeth departs before Jonathan learns her full name and residence, but he finds out her address from the driver who transported her. He calls on her uninvited and learns that she is Lady Stacy, married to Lord Everett Stacy, a caddish gambler who has been frequently refused admission to the syndicates at Lloyd's. Insulted at being dismissed by Stacy as a mere "waiter" at Lloyd's, Jonathan vows to make himself so rich and powerful that even the aristocracy will have to pay him respect.

Within a few years, Jonathan has his own very successful syndicate, but he has become cynical and hardened. He meets Lord and Lady Stacy again and begins seeing her in secret. Stacy, with heavy gambling losses and hounded by creditors, inveigles Jonathan to give him a share of the profits of his syndicate by insinuating he will expose them. War with France results in disastrous losses in 1805 that threaten to bankrupt Lloyd's.

When the insurers raise their rates, British shipowners refuse to sail unless the old rates are restored. Angerstein proposes that the old rates be restored by persuading the Admiralty to provide armed escorts to the merchant vessels. But Horatio Nelson now commands the Royal Navy's Mediterranean Fleet and Jonathan objects that such a course would halve Nelson's fleet at a time when it needs to keep the French fleet blockaded in Toulon, threatening England's survival. He commits his syndicate to the old rates without escorts, single-handedly keeping British commerce going and Nelson's force intact. Stacy hounds Jonathan for funds, but as the losses mount, the syndicate runs out of money and he refuses. Elizabeth agrees to give her newly inherited fortune to Stacy in return for a divorce. However, the French fleet escapes Nelson's blockade anyway and Jonathan is abandoned by his syndicate members. Elizabeth forsakes her divorce and puts her fortune at Jonathan's disposal over his protests. Soon even this runs out.

Lord Drayton, First Lord the Admiralty and Stacy's uncle, agrees to order half of Nelson's fleet to convoy the merchant ships. Before the order can be sent, Jonathan receives a letter from Nelson thanking him for his sacrifices and urging him "at all costs" to protect his fleet from being divided. Jonathan sends a false message from France reporting a victory by Nelson. Stacy, however, learns that Jonathan was in Calais on the day the message was sent and goes to Angerstein. Angerstein warns him that if he denounces Jonathan, he himself will be ruined because Elizabeth's fortune is tied up in the syndicate as well. Stacy finds Jonathan and Elizabeth in each other's arms and shoots his rival in the back. Jonathan, however, has bought enough time for Nelson to win the Battle of Trafalgar, although Nelson is killed. A recovering Jonathan watches from the window as his friend's funeral procession passes by.

Cast

 Freddie Bartholomew as Jonathan Blake (as a boy)
 Madeleine Carroll as Lady Elizabeth
 Sir Guy Standing as John Julius Angerstein
 Tyrone Power as Jonathan Blake
 C. Aubrey Smith as Old "Q"
 Virginia Field as Polly [a waitress at the coffee house who loves Jonathan]
 Douglas Scott as Horatio Nelson
 George Sanders as Lord Everett Stacy
 J. M. Kerrigan as Brook Watson
 Una O'Connor as Widow Blake [Jonathan's aunt]
 Forrester Harvey as Percival Potts
 Gavin Muir as Sir Gavin Gore
 E. E. Clive as Magistrate
 Miles Mander as Jukes
 Montagu Love as Hawkins
 Arthur Hohl as 1st. Captain
 Robert Greig as Lord Drayton 
 Lumsden Hare as Captain Suckling
 Will Stanton as Smutt
 Murray Kinnell as Reverend Nelson
 Billy Bevan as Innkeeper
 Elsa Buchanan as Servant Girl
 Georges Renavent as French Lieutenant
 Reginald Barlow as 2nd. Captain
 May Beatty as Lady Markham
 Lester Matthews as Captain Hardy 
 Vernon Steele as Sir Thomas Lawrence
 Barlowe Borland as Joshua Lamb
 Hugh Huntley as Prince of Wales
 Charles Croker-King as Willoughby
 Ivan Simpson as Old Man
 Holmes Herbert as Spokesman
 Charles McNaughton as Waiter
 Leonard Mudie as Waiter
 Charles Coleman as Waiter
 Thomas Pogue as Benjamin Franklin
 Yorke Sherwood as Dr. Sam Johnson
 Arthur Blake as Member of Jonathan's Syndicate (uncredited)
 Winter Hall as Dr. Beatty (uncredited) 
 Olaf Hytten as Telescope Man (uncredited)

Reception
The New York Times wrote, "Lloyd's of London ... is a pleasing photoplay, crammed with authentic detail of the Georgian England where its scene is laid ... threaded by a semi-fictional story of romance and business daring. Under the graphic direction of the veteran Henry King, a cast that is capable down to its merest fishmonger and chimney sweep brings alive to the screen the London of the waning years of the eighteenth century and the early years of the next ...." Writing for The Spectator, Graham Greene gave the film a mildly positive review, characterizing it as "a fairly astute piece of sentimentality which occasionally overreaches itself". Greene's chief complaint was about the film's authenticity in that the stage would at times become "a little too packed with historical figures rather oddly juxtaposed", and that the mannerisms of Madeleine Carroll and the overall dialogue made it instantly obvious that this was an American film.

The film was nominated for two Academy Awards, one for Best Art Direction by William S. Darling and the other for Best Film Editing by Barbara McLean. Lloyd's of London was the second of the 29 films directed by Henry King that McLean edited.

References
Footnotes

Citations

External links

 
 
 
 

1936 films
1930s historical drama films
American historical drama films
American black-and-white films
Films set in 1770
Films set in the 1780s
Films set in the 1790s
Films set in 1805
Films directed by Henry King
20th Century Fox films
Cultural depictions of Horatio Nelson
Napoleonic Wars films
French Revolutionary Wars films
Films set in Norfolk
Films set in London
Films set in France
1936 drama films
1930s English-language films
1930s American films